The 2015 FIVB Volleyball Boys' U19 World Championship was held in Resistencia and Corrientes, Argentina from 14 to 23 August 2015.

Qualification
The FIVB Sports Events Council confirmed a proposal to streamline the number of teams participating in the Age Group World Championships on 14 December 2013.

*  was the 3rd highest team in the U19 World Ranking which were not yet qualified, but they declined participation.

Pools composition
Teams were seeded in the first two positions of each pool following the Serpentine system according to their FIVB U19 World Ranking as of December 2014. FIVB reserved the right to seed the hosts as head of Pool A regardless of the U19 World Ranking. All teams not seeded were drawn to take other available positions in the remaining lines, following the U19 World Ranking. The draw was held in Resistencia, Argentina on 24 June 2015. Rankings are shown in brackets except the hosts who ranked 5th.

Squads

Venues

Pool standing procedure
 Number of matches won
 Match points
 Sets ratio
 Points ratio
 Result of the last match between the tied teams

Match won 3–0 or 3–1: 3 match points for the winner, 0 match points for the loser
Match won 3–2: 2 match points for the winner, 1 match point for the loser

Preliminary round
All times are Argentina Time (UTC−03:00).

Pool A

|}

|}

Pool B

|}

|}

Pool C

|}

|}

Pool D

|}

|}

Final round
All times are Argentina Time (UTC−03:00).

17th–20th places

|}

|}

Final sixteen

Round of 16

|}

9th–16th quarterfinals

|}

Quarterfinals

|}

13th–16th semifinals

|}

9th–12th semifinals

|}

5th–8th semifinals

|}

Semifinals

|}

15th place match

|}

13th place match

|}

11th place match

|}

9th place match

|}

7th place match

|}

5th place match

|}

3rd place match

|}

Final

|}

Final standing

Awards

Most Valuable Player
 Bartosz Kwolek
Best Setter
 Kamil Droszyński
Best Outside Spikers
 Kaio Ribeiro
 Jan Martínez Franchi

Best Middle Blockers
 Scott Stadick
 Aliasghar Mojarad
Best Opposite Spiker
 Dmitry Yakovlev
Best Libero
 Alexandre Figueiredo

See also
2015 FIVB Volleyball Girls' U18 World Championship

References

External links
Official website
Final Standing
Awards
Statistics

FIVB Volleyball Boys' U19 World Championship
FIVB Boys' U19 World Championship
International volleyball competitions hosted by Argentina
2015 in Argentine sport